Young Social Democrats (MSD) is a social-democratic youth organization in Slovakia connected to the political party Direction – Social Democracy.

History 

MSD was founded in 2002 from the merger of Social Democratic Youth of Slovakia (SDMS) and Young Democratic Left (MDL). While formally an independent organization, MSD has strengthened its ties with the social democratic Smer party by signing a pact on mutual cooperation in 2008.

Political position 

MSD plays a decidedly pragmatic role focusing on promoting democratic participation, the rule of law, ecological behaviour. It is strongly supportive of the European Union and strives for economic development cushioned by a welfare state.

The organisation has courted controversy amongst other social democratic youth organisations for its support for Robert Fico , the current prime minister of Slovakia, who is known for his Opposition to immigration and other political positions.

References

External links 
 Official homepage of Mladí sociálni demokrati 
 Basic information about MSD Slovakia in English

Youth wings of political parties in Slovakia
Youth wings of social democratic parties
Direction – Social Democracy